The following shows the Christian denominations present in Northeast India, along with number of churches and approximate number of Church members.

Anglican
 Church of North India (CNI)
 Diocese of Northeast India (275) 50,000
 Church of South India

Baptist

Note: The membership for Baptist churches mostly denote the adult baptized members of Churches and therefore do not include non-baptized family members as per Baptist Church Doctrine and beliefs.

 Baptist Church of Mizoram (677) 173,988
 Boro Baptist Church Association (219) 47,000
 Council of Baptist Churches in Northeast India (CBCNEI)
 Arunachal Baptist Church Council (1,196) 148,443 
 Assam Baptist Convention (921) 37,410
 Garo Baptist Convention (2,619) 333,908 
 Karbi-Anglong Baptist Convention (338) 37,515
 Manipur Baptist Convention (1,501) 2,21,409
 Kuki Baptist Convention 28,431 Baptized members in 2018
 Mising Baptist Kebang (115) 4,300
 Nagaland Baptist Church Council (1,708) 722,872
 Angami Baptist Church Council
 Ao Baptist Arogo Mungdang
 Evangelical Baptist Convention (207) 40, 859
 Lairam Jesus Christ Baptist Church (119) 19,822
 Lower Assam Baptist Union (335) 38,088
 New Testament Baptist Churches Association (29) 10,000
 North Bank Baptist Christian Association (1,228)  109,838
 Boro Baptist Convention (354) 52,000
 Rabha Baptist Convention (64) 12,356
 Tripura Baptist Christian Union (943)  84,795

Catholic

The Catholic Church in North East India falls under three different rites, all three are in full communion with each other as sister churches and with the Pope and the Holy See of Rome. These include

1) Latin / Roman rite

2) Eastern Syriac - Syro-Malabar Church

3) Western Syriac - Syro-Malankara Church

1) Latin / Roman rite:

The total number of Latin Catholics in North East India as of 2020 stands at 1,913,431 adherents where the region is divided into 3 Metropolitan Archdioceses and 12 suffragan dioceses with a total of 528 parishes and more than 3500 chapels/mission stations/local churches and congregations as per the statistics mentioned below.

Note: The brackets denote the number of Catholic Church parishes

 Metropolitan of Guwahati:
 Archdiocese of Guwahati (46) 57,884
 Diocese of Bongaigaon (36) 72,886
 Diocese of Dibrugarh (37) 134,855
 Diocese of Diphu (26) 68,442
 Diocese of Tezpur (33) 203,820
 Diocese of Itanagar (42) 83,822
 Diocese of Miao (30) 98,600
 Metropolitan of Shillong
Archdiocese of Shillong (35) 342,169
 Diocese of Nongstoin (22) 164,334
 Diocese of Jowai (18) 111,930
 Diocese of Tura (45) 326,716
 Diocese of Agartala (21) 48,747
 Diocese of Aizawl (32) 41,067
 Metropolitan of Imphal:
Archdiocese of Imphal (53) 101,283
 Diocese of Kohima (52) 61,876
 Although geographically Sikkim is part of North East India. The state of Sikkim falls under the Roman Catholic Diocese of Darjeeling with 60 parishes and 37,320 Catholics. This diocese fall under the province of the Archdiocese of Calcutta and ecclesiastically not included in the North Eastern region of India.

 (2) Syro Malabar Church Mission to the North East:
With the decision of the synod of bishops of the Syro Malabar Catholic Church and under the guidance of Mar Raphael Thattil, the Syro Malabar Bishop of Shamshabad, a delegation  made a visit to the North -Eastern States of Tripura, Assam, Meghalaya, Arunachal Pradesh from 7 May to 18 May 2019. 
On the basis of this visit and after much prayers, reflections and discussions together with the guidance of the Major Archbishop of Syro-Malabar Church Archbishop Mar George Alenchery, the Bishops took the decision to start the evangelical mission of the Syro Malabar Church in Northeast India. Thus the Eparchy of Irinjalakuda was invited to start a mission in the Northeast.
The Bishop of Irinjalakuda accepted the Divine invitation and started the Silchar Syro-Malabar Catholic Mission - in short Silchar Mission - with St. Paul the Apostole of the Gentiles as the Heavenly Patron.
On the day of the feast of the Assumption of Our Lady, 15 August 2019, the first mission house and chapel dedicated to the Most Sacred Heart of Jesus were blessed at Silchar and the solemn Holy Qurbana was offered.

 (3) Syro Malankara Church mission to the North East:
Pope Francis, on 26 March 2015 at 4:30 pm  by the Decree N 7780/15 also erected the St. John Chrysostom Diocese for the Malankara Syrian Catholic Church which include the North Eastern region of India. The mission to North East India is presently under the care of Rev. Fr. Jigmy Thomas, Rev. Fr. Justin Raj R. and Rev. Fr. Sabi Varghese.

Congregational
 Kuki Christian Church (312) 38,600
 Evangelical Congregational Church of India (520) 72,500
 Evangelical Free Church of India (293) 67,401
 Independent Church of India (182) 65,027
 Evangelical Church of Maraland (85) 33,000

Lutheran
 Northern Evangelical Lutheran Church (180) 87,541 
 Evangelical Lutheran Church in the Himalayan States 24,750
 Bodo Evangelical Lutheran Church (65) 11,510  
 Gossner Evangelical Lutheran Church in Chotanagpur and Assam
 Manipur Evangelical Lutheran Church (49) 8,500

Methodist
 Methodist Church in India
 Methodist Mission Church in North East India (MMC NEI)
 Wesleyan Methodist Church of East India (Wesleyan Church)
 Mizoram Wesleyan Methodist Church

Pentecostal
 Christian Revival Church
 Nagaland Christian Revival Church (1,195) 355,000
Christian Revival Church Council Arunachal Pradesh (APCRCC)
 Christian Revival Church Assam
 Christian Revival Church Manipur
 Christian Revival Church Meghalaya
 Christian Revival Church Sikkim
Christian Revival Church Tripura
Christian Revival Church West Bengal
 Church of God, Meghalaya and Assam (563) 100,000
 United Pentecostal Church, North East India (UPCNEI) 91,720
 United Pentecostal Church (Mizoram) 41,558
 Assembly Church of Jesus Christ Full Gospel (300) 40,000
 Isua Krista Kohhran
 Nagaland Pentecostal Church (NPC)
 Assembly of God
 Indian Pentecostal Church of God
 The Pentecostal Mission

Presbyterian
The Presbyterian Church of India consists of the following synods with 4,616 churches and 1,467,529 members as of 2018: 
 Biateram Presbyterian Synod 16,953
 Cachar Hill Tribes Presbyterian Synod 34,153
 Karbi Anglong Presbyterian Church Synod (62) 22,952
 Khasi Jaintia Presbyterian Synod Mihngi (576) 294,320
 Khasi Jaintia Presbyterian Synod Sepngi (854) 370,764
 Manipur Presbyterian Church Synod (110) 15,571
 Meitei Presbyterian Singlup Synod (85) 8,785
 Mizoram Presbyterian Synod (1,266) 611,241
 Ri Bhoi Presbyterian Synod 70,013
 Tripura Presbyterian Church Synod  (325) 22,277
 Zou Presbyterian Synod (68) 11,768

Seventh-day Adventist
 The Northeast Indian Union of Seventh-day Adventist has 220 Churches and 53,226 members and comprises the following:
Mizo Conference of Seventh-day Adventist  (81) 22,446
Khasi Jaintia Conference (28) 5,426
Manipur Conference (46) 6,644 
Garo Section (43) 11,960
Arunachal Pradesh Region (1) 367
Assam Region (18) 5,594
Nagaland Region (3) 789
Tripura Region

Others
 The Salvation Army 55,791
 Unitarian Union of North East India 10,000
 Holy Christ Church North east India (1500)
 Believers Eastern Church

See also
 Baptist World Alliance
 List of Christian denominations in India
 List of Roman Catholic dioceses in India
 North East India Christian Council
 Bible translations into the languages of Northeast India
 Presbyterian Church of India
 Christian Revival Church
 Christianity in India

References

External links
 Baptist Statistics
 Catholic Hierarchy and Diocese Statistics
 GCatholic.org 
 Presbyterian Statistics
 Adventist Yearbook
 

Northeast India
India religion-related lists
Northeast India
India